Taleqan Dam (also Talaqan Dam) is a hydroelectric dam in Iran with an installed electricity generating capability of 18 MW. It is situated in Qazvin Province. downstream of Alborz province and incorporates a pipe line to Hashtgerd.

It was constructed between 2002 and 2006 on the Shahrud and Taleghan Rivers creating the Taleghan reservoir.

See also

List of power stations in Iran

References

Hydroelectric power stations in Iran